Vyazovsky is a rural locality (a village) in Bakhtybayevsky Selsoviet, Birsky District, Bashkortostan, Russia. The population was 144 as of 2010. There are 5 streets.

Geography 
Vyazovsky is located 15 km north of Birsk (the district's administrative centre) by road. Bazhenovo is the nearest rural locality.

References 

Rural localities in Birsky District